Alexandra Linsley Long (born August 13, 1987) is an American soccer player who plays as a midfielder for NJ/NY Gotham FC in the National Women's Soccer League and the United States national team. She made her debut for the national team on May 8, 2014, in a friendly against Canada. She has since made 45 total appearances for the team.

Long played college soccer for the Penn State Nittany Lions for the 2005 and 2006 seasons before transferring to the University of North Carolina to play for the Tar Heels. Long was a member of the Tar Heels team that won the NCAA Women's Soccer Tournament in 2008. Professionally, Long has played for the Washington Freedom and Sky Blue FC of Women's Professional Soccer, Paris Saint-Germain of  Division 1 Féminine in France, and the New York Fury of Women's Premier Soccer League Elite. She played for Portland Thorns FC of the National Women's Soccer League from 2013 to 2017.

Early life
Born in Huntington, New York to Barbara and James Long, Allie was raised with her younger brother Patrick. She started playing soccer for the Northport Cow Harbor Mustangs of the Long Island Junior Soccer League. She then played with the Albertson Soccer Club, where she won four consecutive State Open Cup titles. Long was a member of the Olympic Development Program of the Eastern New York Youth Soccer Association for five years and Region 1 ODP for four years.

Long attended Northport High School from 2001 to 2005, where she played varsity soccer for four years. Long helped her high school team go undefeated in the regular season for all four years. In 2005, Northport advanced to the Long Island semifinals. Long was named to the All-State first team and All-County team all four years at Northport. After her junior and senior year, she was Newsday's Player of the Year and Suffolk County Player of the Year. Long also made the All-Long Island Team for her last two years at Northport.

Pennsylvania State University, 2005–2006
Long attended Pennsylvania State University from 2005–2006. During her freshman year in 2005, she appeared in all 25 games, starting 22. After starting the first game, she entered the starting lineup permanently in the fifth game of the season, remaining there for the balance of the Lions' 23–0–2 season. She scored four goals on 58 shots and had six assists for the season. Long was a 2005 National Soccer Coaches Association of America Third-Team All-Mid-Atlantic Region selection and was named to the Soccer Buzz second-team All-Mid-Atlantic Region, Soccer Buzz second-team freshman All-America squad, and was tapped for the Soccer Buzz 2005 Freshman All-Mid-Atlantic Region Team. She was also named to the second-team All-Big Ten squad and the All-Tournament Team at the 2005 Big Ten Tournament and earned Big Ten All-Freshman Team honors.

During her second year in 2006, Long scored six goals and added four assists for the Nittany Lions. Allie started all 21 games that she played in after missing the first five games while playing for the United States in the U-20 World Championships in Moscow, Russia.  She scored her first goal of the season September 24 against Michigan. She also recorded a goal and an assist in the game at Iowa on September 29 and against Northwestern on October 22. Long scored the game-winning goal against Minnesota on October 13 and against Illinois in the Big Ten Tournament on November 5. She was a first-team All-Big Ten selection and was named to the National Soccer Coaches Association first-team All-Mid-Atlantic Region team. She was the Big Ten's offensive player of the week on October 23, 2006. She was a 2006 Soccer Buzz first-team all-region selection and was selected for the Academic All-Big Ten Team.

University of North Carolina at Chapel Hill, 2007–2008
During her junior year in 2007, Long transferred to the University of North Carolina at Chapel Hill. She appeared in all 24 games, starting in 22. Long scored five goals during the season. She picked up her first two goals as a Tar Heel against Yale for her only multiple goal game of the season, for which she was named to Soccer America, Soccer Buzz and Top Drawer Soccer National Teams of the Week. She was also on the watchlist for the Hermann Trophy.

Club career

Long Island Fury 
Long played with the Long Island Fury in the Women's Premier Soccer League under head coach Paul Riley during summers between college seasons.

Washington Freedom, 2009–2010
On January 16, 2009, Long was selected seventh overall in the first round of the 2009 Women's Professional Soccer Draft by the Washington Freedom for the inaugural 2009 WPS season. She made her first appearance for the team on March 29, 2009 in a match against the Los Angeles Sol. During the 2009 regular season, Long made 18 appearances for the Freedom, helping the team finish third in the WPS. She also made two goals during the regular season. The Freedom faced Sky Blue FC in the first round of the playoffs on August 15 and were defeated 2–1, ending their advancement in the postseason tournament. Long remained with the Washington Freedom for the 2010 WPS season. Long scored the lone goal in the team's opening game of the season on April 10 against the Boston Breakers. She went on to make 21 appearances for the Freedom in the regular season and scored two goals. The Freedom finished fourth in the WPS after the regular season but were defeated by the Philadelphia Independence in the first round of the playoffs on September 19.

Sky Blue FC, 2011

Following the 2010 season, Long became a free agent and was subsequently signed by Sky Blue FC in November 2010. Jim Gabarra, the head coach of Sky Blue, stated that "Allie has been establishing herself as a prominent player in this league" and that he expected her to "continue developing and helping our team to be successful." She made her first appearance for Sky Blue on April 10, 2011 in a match against Philadelphia Independence. Following the match, Long was named the WPS Player of the Week. Long made 18 appearances for Sky Blue in the regular season and scored three goals, two of those on penalty kicks. Sky Blue finished fifth in the WPS after the regular season and did not advance to the playoffs.

Paris Saint-Germain, 2011–2012
Immediately following the 2011 WPS season, Long played for Paris Saint-Germain in the Division 1 Féminine in France for the 2011–2012 season, which ran from September to June. She first made an appearance for the team on October 16, 2011 in a match against FF Yzeure Allier Auvergne. She made 12 appearances for the team, starting nine, and scored four goals. Her last appearance for the team was on March 25, 2012.

New York Fury, 2012 
On January 30, 2012, it was announced that the 2012 WPS season would be suspended following legal and financial challenges. Although the league was intended to resume for the 2013 season, it officially folded in May. In April 2012, Long signed with the New York Fury in the Women's Premier Soccer League Elite, a semi-professional soccer league created by the WPSL in response to the suspension of the WPS. The Fury finished third in the league and qualified for the playoffs. The Fury faced the Western New York Flash on July 25, 2012 in the semifinals. Long scored the Fury's lone goal of the match and the team was defeated 2–1.

Portland Thorns FC, 2013–2017 

On January 17, 2013, it was revealed that Long had signed with the Portland Thorns FC of the newly formed National Women's Soccer League for the 2013 season. Long became one of Portland's top players over the years, scoring the most goals in the 2015 season and leading the team to the title in 2013, the semifinal in 2014 and 2016, and the title again in 2017. At the end of the Thorns' 2017 season, she had the most appearances for the team over its five seasons and was its second-leading scorer, one goal behind captain Christine Sinclair.

Chelsea FC, 2013 (loan) 
Following the 2013 NWSL season, Long agreed to a brief off-season loan to Chelsea Ladies. She played in Chelsea's International Women's Club Championship campaign in Japan and returned to Portland afterwards without appearing in a league match.

Reign FC, 2018–2021
On January 11, 2018, Long was traded to the Reign FC in exchange for Australian international forward Caitlin Foord and a 2020 NWSL 2nd Round draft pick.

Long appeared in 19 regular season games for Seattle in 2018 and scored three goals. She missed the last three games of the regular season due to a knee injury but returned to the lineup for Seattle's semi-final match against her former team, the Portland Thorns. Seattle lost to Portland, 2–1.

NJ/NY Gotham FC, 2021–present 
On April 27, 2021, NJ/NY Gotham FC acquired Long from OL Reign in exchange for $80,000 in allocation money and a second round draft pick.

Futsal
For several years during her professional career, Long has played indoor soccer, futsal, in Queens and Brooklyn, New York City. She plays in high-school gymnasiums on highly-competitive men's teams for prize money. She is a favorite with spectators, mostly Latinos, who call her "la rubia" (blondie) and "la blanquita" (little white girl). She was introduced to futsal by her then-boyfriend Jose Batista, formerly a professional soccer player and a futsal player.

International career
Long represented the United States on the U-20 and U-23 national teams and was a member of the 2006 U-20 Women's World Championship team. She was called up to the full national team in July 2010.

On May 8, 2014 Long made her international debut for the United States senior women's team against Canada in a friendly match at Winnipeg; entering the match at the 68th minute. She scored her first and second goals in a friendly against Colombia on April 6, 2016, in East Hartford at Renschler Field.

Long was on the U.S. national team at the 2016 Olympics, starting in three of the four matches the U.S. team played.

After the Olympics and into early 2017, USWNT coach Jill Ellis experimented with different formations and Long started several matches playing centre-back as part of a three back. After having mixed results with the three back, Ellis shifted back to a traditional four back and Long moved back to her normal midfield position.

Following the Olympics, Long remained on the bubble of the senior team roster while coach Jill Ellis experimented with new talent. Long was named to the provisional roster for the 2018 CONCACAF Women's Championship but was not named to the final 20-player roster. In November 2018, Long was included in the roster for a set of friendlies in Europe in November 2018, making an appearance off the bench in the team's match against Scotland. In 2019, she was not included in the 26-player training camp in January, and in February was named to the pre-tournament training camp but not the final 23-player roster for the SheBelieves Cup. Long made appearances off the bench in both April 2019 friendlies for the USWNT against Australia and Belgium.

In May 2019, Long was named to the final roster for the 2019 FIFA Women's World Cup, marking her first senior World Cup appearance.

International goals

Personal life
In October 2016, Long married long-time boyfriend Jose Batista, with teammates Alex Morgan and Tobin Heath as her maids of honor. In January 2022, Long announced that she and Batista separated.

In April 2022, Long announced that she is expecting twins with boyfriend Casey Cordial.  On May 23, 2022, Long gave birth to a girl Siena Maxwell and a boy Trent Jameson.

Honors and awards 
North Carolina Tar Heels
 NCAA Division I Women's Soccer Championship: 2008

Portland Thorns
 NWSL Championship: 2013, 2017
 NWSL Shield: 2016

United States

 FIFA Women's World Cup: 2019

 SheBelieves Cup: 2018
 Tournament of Nations: 2018

Individual
 NSCAA All-Mid-Atlantic Region Third Team: 2005
 Soccer Buzz All-Mid-Atlantic Region Second Team: 2005
 Soccer Buzz Freshman All-America Second Team: 2005
 Soccer Buzz Freshman All-Mid-Atlantic Region Team: 2005
 All-Big Ten Second Team: 2005
 All-Big Ten Tournament Team: 2005
 Big Ten All-Freshman Team: 2005
 All-Big Ten First Team: 2006
 NSCAA All-Mid-Atlantic Region First Team: 2006
 Soccer Buzz All-Mid-Atlantic Region First Team: 2006
 All-Big Ten Academic Team: 2006
 MAC Hermann Trophy Watch List: 2007
 Top Drawer Soccer Third Team: 2007
 NWSL Best XI: 2015, 2016
 NWSL Second XI: 2014
 Suffolk Sports Hall of Fame: 2020

See also

References

Match reports

Further reading 
 Grainey, Timothy (2012), Beyond Bend It Like Beckham: The Global Phenomenon of Women's Soccer, University of Nebraska Press, 
 Lisi, Clemente A. (2010), The U.S. Women's Soccer Team: An American Success Story, Scarecrow Press, 
 Stevens, Dakota (2011), A Look at the Women's Professional Soccer Including the Soccer Associations, Teams, Players, Awards, and More, BiblioBazaar,

External links

 
 
 
 US Soccer player profile
 

Living people
1987 births
North Carolina Tar Heels women's soccer players
National Women's Soccer League players
Portland Thorns FC players
Paris Saint-Germain Féminine players
Expatriate women's footballers in France
Women's Premier Soccer League Elite players
Chelsea F.C. Women players
United States women's international soccer players
Footballers at the 2016 Summer Olympics
Olympic soccer players of the United States
People from Huntington, New York
American women's soccer players
Penn State Nittany Lions women's soccer players
United States women's under-20 international soccer players
American women's futsal players
OL Reign players
Division 1 Féminine players
Soccer players from New York (state)
Women's association football midfielders
2019 FIFA Women's World Cup players
FIFA Women's World Cup-winning players
21st-century American women
Women's Professional Soccer players